Pseudopachychaeta is a genus of grass flies in the family Chloropidae. There is at least one described species in Pseudopachychaeta, P. approximatonervis.

References

Further reading

External links

 Diptera.info

Chloropinae